Südostbayernbahn (Southeast Bavaria Railway) is one of several regional railway networks in Germany owned by Germany's national railway, Deutsche Bahn AG (DB AG). Since 2001, the network has included the railway hub of Mühldorf which connects 7 major railway lines from Munich, Rosenheim, Freilassing, Burghausen, Simbach am Inn, Passau and Landshut, forming a star-shaped network of lines called Linienstern Mühldorf ("Mühldorf route star network"). SüdostBayernBahn is subordinated to DB RegioNetz Verkehr and DB RegioNetz Infrastruktur.

Railway network 
In order to be able to operate railway networks more efficiently on a geographical basis, the Deutsche Bahn introduced the concept of regional networks or Regio-Netze. One of the five national Regio-Netze is called the Südostbayernbahn (SOB) and is responsible for the infrastructure, and/or passenger services, on the following routes:

Operations 

Südostbayernbahn has rented the lines for an extended period of time and is therefore classed as the railway infrastructure company for its network. The renting of the routes from DB Netz is done through DB RegioNetz Infrastruktur.

As a railway infrastructure company, Südostbayernbahn now only operates trains which provide passenger services (the freight services to Frontenhausen-Marklkofen having been taken over by Railion). These passenger services are provided using  Class 218 locomotives and Class 628 diesel multiple units. Amongst the coaches used are modernized Silberling carriages and double-decker coaches. The double-deckers include three air-conditioned double-decker driving cars. The delivery of the latest class of air-conditioned, double-decker coaches began in March 2007. On those routes for which Südostbayernbahn is only responsible for infrastructure, RegionalBahn trains are operated by DB Regio Bayern using Class 628 diesel multiple units and Class 426 electric multiple units. In addition RegionalBahn trains are also run by Südostbayernbahn themselves on the following lines:

 Mühldorf–Dorfen–Munich Hauptbahnhof (KBS 940)
 via Freilassing to Salzburg (KBS 945/951)
 via Ebersberg to Grafing, individual trains to Munich Ost (KBS 948)

In total the network has 435 km of line and 88 stations, which are worked daily by 260 trains. Around 9.5 million passengers use Südostbayernbahn trains annually.

References

External links
 

Deutsche Bahn
Railway companies of Germany
Companies based in Mühldorf